Aniya Louissaint (born 9 September 1998) is a Haitian taekwondo athlete.

She represented Haiti at the 2016 Summer Olympics in Rio de Janeiro, in the women's 67 kg where she was defeated by Haby Niaré in the first round and by Ruth Gbagbi in the repechage round.

References

1998 births
Living people
Haitian female taekwondo practitioners
Olympic taekwondo practitioners of Haiti
Taekwondo practitioners at the 2016 Summer Olympics
Pan American Games competitors for Haiti
Taekwondo practitioners at the 2015 Pan American Games
Taekwondo practitioners at the 2019 Pan American Games
21st-century Haitian women